Brassica carinata is a species of flowering plant in the Brassicaceae family. It is referred to by the common names Ethiopian rape or Ethiopian mustard. It is believed to be a hybrid between Brassica nigra and Brassica oleracea.

The flowers attract honey bees to collect pollen and nectar.

Leaf uses
The plant has a mild flavor, and is eaten as a leaf vegetable. Named varieties include Texsel, which is particularly adapted to temperate climates. Cultivation of Ethiopia mustard as leaf vegetable is limited to small-scale production but it is slowly gaining popularity in rural as well as urban areas where commercial production is taking place.

Seed uses
Although Brassica carinata is cultivated as an oilseed crop in Ethiopia, it has high levels of undesirable glucosinolates and erucic acid. The closely related Brassica napus (rapeseed) is considered a better oilseed crop in comparison.

Brassica carinata has been used to develop an aviation biofuel for jet engines. On October 29, 2012, the first flight of a jet aircraft powered completely by biofuel, made from Brassica carinata, was completed.  The byproduct of Brassica carinata oil production is utilized in protein meal for animal fodder.

Industrial application
The oil quality profile includes a high percentage of erucic acid (40–45 %) making it highly desirable as a biofuel and for industrial applications such as production of plastics, lubricants, paints, leather tanning, soaps, and cosmetics.

References

carinata
Flora of Ethiopia
Leaf vegetables
Taxa named by Alexander Braun